Rahachow or Rogachev is a town in Gomel Region, Belarus. It is the administrative center of Rahachow District. It has a population of 34,727 (2004 estimate).

The town is first mentioned in 1142 in Russian chronicles. From the late thirteenth century it was part of the Grand Duchy of Lithuania, and then the Polish–Lithuanian Commonwealth. In 1772 the Rahačoŭ District was annexed by the Russian Empire.

On 16 July 1863 the local landowner Tomasz Hryniewicz was executed here by a Russian firing squad for leading the Rahačoŭ detachment of Polish insurgents.

During World War II, Rahačoŭ was occupied by the German Army from 2 July 1941 to 13 July 1941, and again from 14 August 1941 to 24 February 1944.

The notable Rabbi, Yosef Rosen (1858–1936), known as the Rogatshover Gaon ("The Genius of Rogatshov" (the Yiddish pronunciation of Rahachow), was born and raised here. The artist Anatoli Lvovich Kaplan was born (1902) and brought up here, as was former NHL hockey player Sergei Bautin. Rahachow also has a popular dairy product factory, whose products are supplied across Russia, Ukraine, and Belarus.

Sights

 Church of St. Anthony of Padua
 Cathedral of Alexander Nevsky
 "Castle Hill" - a hill on which the castle of Queen Bona was located
 Monument to the founding of the city in the center of the "Castle Hill" with the inscription "From here the city of Rogachev went in the summer of 1142."
 Jewish Cemetery in Rahachow
 The building of the former zemstvo council
 House of merchant Belenky
 Eco-Museum "Belarusian Lyalka"
 Museum of Popular Glory
 House of Uladzimir Karatkievich's grandfather
 Monument to condensed milk
 Rahachow booms
 Icon of the Mother of God with four hands
 Three family tombs - Greshnerov, Iolshinov, Verzheisky
 Memorial to the leader of the national liberation uprising of 1863 Tomas Grinevich

References

External links

 Photos on Radzima.org

Populated places in Gomel Region
Towns in Belarus
Radimichs
Minsk Voivodeship
Rogachyovsky Uyezd
Populated places on the Dnieper in Belarus